Taman is a rural locality (a selo) in Usolsky District, Perm Krai, Russia. The population was 82 as of 2010. There are 7 streets.

Geography 
Taman is located 74 km southwest of Usolye (the district's administrative centre) by road. Bystraya is the nearest rural locality.

References 

Rural localities in Perm Krai